This list tracks the presumed support (based on endorsements) for given United States presidential candidates among the 775 unpledged delegates (commonly known as superdelegates, and referred to in the 2020 election cycle as "automatic delegates") who were eligible to cast a vote at the 2020 Democratic National Convention, in Milwaukee, Wisconsin. The convention was postponed to August 17–20, 2020, due to the ongoing coronavirus pandemic in the United States. The 8 unpledged delegates from Democrats Abroad carried half-votes at the convention, yielding a forecast total of 771 votes. Unpledged delegates represented about 16% of the overall convention votes (4,754 delegates, 4,750 votes), though reforms severely restricted their ability to vote on a first ballot, and came from several categories of prominent Democratic Party members:

 26 distinguished party leaders (DPL), consisting of former Democratic presidents and vice-presidents, former Democratic house speakers and minority leaders, former Democratic senate leaders, and former DNC chairs
 236 Democratic members of the United States House of Representatives (including non-voting delegates from Washington, D.C., and territories)
 48 Democratic members of the United States Senate (including D.C. shadow senators) and Bernie Sanders, an Independent who caucuses with the Democratic Party
 28 Democratic governors (including territorial governors and the Mayor of the District of Columbia).
 439 other elected members (with 435 votes) from the Democratic National Committee (including the chair of the DNC, as well as the chairs and vice-chairs of each state's Democratic Party)

Automatic delegates are "unpledged" in the sense that they themselves decide which candidate to support. (In other words, they are not allocated according to voter preferences as the majority of delegates are.) Pledged delegates can change their vote if no candidate is elected on the first ballot and can even vote for a different candidate on the first ballot if they are "released" by the candidate they are pledged to. Automatic delegates, on the other hand, can change their vote purely of their own volition. With the exception of the eight DNC members from the Democrats Abroad, who each receive a half-vote, all automatic delegates are entitled to one vote (including when a sitting official or distinguished party leader is also a DNC member). Throughout this list, those who qualify under multiple categories are considered as DPLs first, then as sitting officials, and then as DNC members (for example, a sitting senator who is also a DNC member is listed as a senator).

The list below is based on the most recent information on how unpledged delegates have endorsed candidates in the 2020 Democratic Party presidential primaries. Data is sourced from FiveThirtyEights endorsement tracker where more recent data is not available.

Totals by group 

* = candidates who withdrew or suspended their campaigns

Note: Democrats Abroad automatic delegates are assigned half-votes; each of them accounts for  rather than 1 in the table above.

List

See also
 2020 Democratic Party presidential primaries
 List of superdelegates at the 2008 Democratic National Convention
 List of superdelegates at the 2016 Democratic National Convention

Notes

References 

2020-related lists
Automatic Delegates
Lists of American politicians
Lists of political people
United States politics-related lists